This is a summary of the performances of various international teams in the Cricket World Cup

Debutant teams

(O)- Obsolete

Performance of teams

So far, 20 teams have competed in the Cricket World Cup at least once (excluding qualifying tournaments). Of these, seven teams have taken part in every competition and only five have won. England are the current champions and 2019 is their only victory. Australia have won five times (1987, 1999, 2003, 2007 and 2015) The West Indies won the first two, India won two (1983 and 2011), Sri Lanka and Pakistan won one each.  The West Indies and Australia are also the only nations to have won consecutive titles (West Indies: 1975 and 1979; Australia: 1999, 2003 and 2007). Australia have also notably featured in 7 finals of the total 11 World Cups, including the four in a row (1996 to 2007). The furthest a non-Test playing nation has ever reached is the semi-finals, achieved by Kenya in the 2003 tournament.

India is the first host country to have won the world cup on the home ground in 2011. In 2015 Australia became the second host country to win the world cup. The only other host to reach a Final was England in the second tournament in 1979. Sri Lanka and England aside, other co-host nations which achieved or equalled their best finish in World Cups were New Zealand as semi-finalists in 1992 and runners-up in 2015, Zimbabwe reaching the Super Six in 2003 and Kenya as semi-finalists in 2003. In 1987, both co-hosting nations, India and Pakistan reached the semi-finals but neither managed to reach the final after losing to Australia and England respectively.

Upsets

Due to the large gap in funding and skill set between non-test playing nations and test playing nations, it is rare for a non-test playing nation to defeat a test playing nation. Often these performances help Associate nations earn Test Status. Full member nations receive automatic qualification to the World Cup, while Associates have to qualify (with the exception of Kenya for the 2003 and 2007 World Cups). Victories by Associates over Full members have happened 13 times over 10 tournaments. Ireland has caused the most number of upsets with four, while England, Pakistan, West Indies and Zimbabwe have suffered the most number of upsets with two.

Overview
The table below provides an overview of the performances of teams over past World Cups, as of the end of the 2019 tournament.

Team results
Comprehensive team results of the World Cup. See below for legend.

{|
|-valign="top"
|

Legend
 – Champions
 – Second place
 – Semi-finals
S8 – Super Eight (2007 only)
S6 – Super Six (1999–2003)
QF – Quarter-finals (1996, 2011–2015)
R1 – First Round
X – Did not play

References

Teams